Clarksville Municipal Airport  is a public-use airport located three nautical miles (3.5 mi, 5.6 km) east of the central business district of Clarksville, in Johnson County, Arkansas, United States. It is owned by the City of Clarksville.

This airport is included in the FAA's National Plan of Integrated Airport Systems for 2011–2015, which categorized it as a general aviation airport.

Facilities and aircraft 
Clarksville Municipal Airport covers an area of 151 acres (61 ha) at an elevation of 481 feet (147 m) above mean sea level. It has one runway designated 9/27 with an asphalt surface measuring 4,508 by 75 feet (1,374 x 23 m).

For the 12-month period ending November 30, 2010, the airport had 4,500 general aviation aircraft operations, an average of 12 per day. At that time there were 14 aircraft based at this airport: 86% single-engine, 7% multi-engine and 7% helicopter.

References

External links 
 Clarksville Municipal (H35) at     Arkansas Department of Aeronautics
 Aerial image as of 5 April 2000 from USGS The National Map
 
 

Airports in Arkansas
Transportation in Johnson County, Arkansas